Jawaharial Williams is a Democratic member of the Illinois House of Representatives for the 10th district. The district includes parts of the Chicago neighborhoods of Austin, East Garfield Park, Humboldt Park, Lincoln Park, Logan Square, Near North Side, Near West Side, West Garfield Park, and West Town.

Williams was appointed in May 2019 to replace outgoing representative Melissa Conyears-Ervin after her election to the post of City Treasurer of Chicago.

Before his appointment as state representative, Williams was a laborer in the Chicago Department of Water Management, a member of the Laborers' International Union of North America and Plumbers Local 130 UA, former president of the Young Democrats of Illinois, and a community volunteer.

Williams is the step-son of Chicago Alderman Walter Burnett Jr.

As of July 3, 2022, Representative Williams is a member of the following Illinois House committees:

 Financial Institutions Committee (HFIN)
 Labor & Commerce Committee (HLBR)
 Public Utilities Committee (HPUB)
 Transportation: Regulation, Roads & Bridges Committee (HTRR)
 Transportation: Vehicles & Safety Committee (HVES)
 Utilities Subcommittee (HPUB-UTIL)

Electoral history

References

External links
Representative Jawaharial Williams (D) at the Illinois General Assembly

1975 births
21st-century American politicians
African-American state legislators in Illinois
Laborers' International Union of North America people
Living people
Democratic Party members of the Illinois House of Representatives
Northeastern Illinois University alumni
Politicians from Chicago
21st-century African-American politicians
20th-century African-American people